Fatma Aydemir (born 1986) is a German author and journalist based in Berlin. She is best known for her novel Ellbogen (Elbow), which won both the 2018 Franz Hessel Prize and the Klaus Michael Kühne prize for best debut novel of 2017.

Biography 
Aydemir was born in Karlsruhe, West Germany. She is the granddaughter of Turkish-Kurdish immigrants.

She is an editor and columnist for Die Tageszeitung. Before it ceased publication, she wrote for the German music magazine Spex. She also founded a bilingual (German and Turkish) portal in response to incursions against press freedom in Turkey.

Works

References

External links 
 K24 interview
 Words Without Borders Interview

1986 births
Living people
21st-century German journalists
21st-century German women writers
German people of Turkish descent
Writers from Karlsruhe
Journalists from Berlin
German newspaper journalists
German women journalists
Die Tageszeitung people